Xylomelum pyriforme, commonly known as the woody pear, is a species of plant in the family Proteaceae native to eastern Australia. It grows as a large shrub or small tree to five metres high.

Taxonomy
First documented at Botany Bay by Joseph Banks and Daniel Solander in 1770, it was first described as Banksia pyriformis by German botanist Joseph Gaertner in 1788 in De Fructibus et Seminibus Plantarum. It was given its current name in 1809 by the gardener Joseph Knight in his On the cultivation of the plants belonging to the natural order of Proteeae. The species name "pear-shaped" is derived from the Latin words pyrus "pear" and forma "shape".

Description
The large juvenile leaves have dentate (toothed) margins with 6 to 11 teeth along each edge, while the adult leaves have entire margins. They are glabrous (smooth) and dark green. New growth is covered in a fine rust-coloured fur. Flowering takes place from September to November, peaking in October. The inflorescences measure  and are rusty coloured.

Distribution and habitat
The plant's range is from the New South Wales mid-north coast south to Mittagong, with an outlying record from the vicinity of Cooma. Xylomelum pyriforme grows on plateau and ridges in nutrient-poor well-drained sandstone soils in open eucalypt woodland. It is associated with such species as yellow bloodwood (Corymbia eximia), red bloodwood (C. gummifera), scribbly gum (Eucalyptus haemastoma), silvertop ash (E. sieberi), brown stringybark (E. capitellata), grey gum (E. punctata) and scribbly gum (E. sclerophylla).

Ecology
Xylomelum pyriforme regenerates from a lignotuber or epicormic buds after bushfires, and can sucker from the roots. It is one of a number of Australian species that require a fire to open and disperse their seeds.

The fungus Giugnardia causes leaf spot, while Cephaleutos virescens is responsible for an algal leaf spot.

Cultivation and uses
Rarely seen in cultivation due to the scarcity of seed, Xylomelum pyriforme seedlings grow readily but commonly quickly succumb to damping off. A plant may take 20 years to reach flowering stage from seed.

Early European settlers of Australia used the tree's wood to make gun stocks.

References

pyriforme
Proteales of Australia
Trees of Australia
Flora of New South Wales
Plants described in 1788